"Pilot" is the first episode of the Syfy series Warehouse 13. It first aired July 7, 2009, and was written by Brent Mote, Jane Espenson, and David Simkins and directed by Jace Alexander.

Plot
At a Washington, D.C. museum, Secret Service agents Myka Bering (Joanne Kelly) and Pete Lattimer (Eddie McClintock) clash over plans for a Presidential visit; Myka is exceptionally organized, rigid, and by-the-book, while Pete is more flexible and receptive to the "vibe" of a situation. A curator cuts his finger on the crystal teeth of a carved stone head called an "Aztec Bloodstone" and is soon possessed by it. Later noticing a steady trickle of blood coming from the Bloodstone, on instinct, Pete removes it from the display. Myka dramatically thwarts the zombie-like curator's knife attack of the President (actually an attack on the Mexican Ambassador's daughter, as the "Bloodstone" craves virgin sacrifices) as Pete is confronted by a man who knows his name and disappears with the Bloodstone in a flash of light. Pete is temporarily suspended pending an investigation into his strange story, but later visited by the mysterious Mrs. Frederick (C. C. H. Pounder), who orders him to report to particular coordinates for an extended special assignment. Arriving at a remote government warehouse in South Dakota, Pete finds a flummoxed Myka close behind him. They are welcomed to Warehouse 13 by Artie Nielsen (Saul Rubinek), the man who had taken the Bloodstone. Artie explains that they will be joining him as "gatherers and protectors of secrets"—specifically, empowered and potentially dangerous objects stored in the warehouse and located out in the world and need of retrieval. Pete is somewhat intrigued by what Artie calls "America's attic," while Myka feels she is "too valuable to be wasted" at such a task.

While Myka and Pete's former boss Daniel Dickenson (Simon Reynolds) is trying to figure out how to get them back, Artie sends the agents to investigate a report of domestic abuse in Seever City, Iowa which he believes may be connected to an item. The agents meet University of Southern Iowa law student Cody Thomas, being held for assaulting his girlfriend; during questioning, Cody begins speaking 15th century Italian and flies into a rage. The Renaissance professor who translates his words is driven to suicide, and Cody's godmother and lawyer, Lorna Solliday (Sherry Miller), reveals Cody's girlfriend, Emily, as the reason. Myka and Pete see a jeweled comb on Lorna, who suddenly tries to kill them. An unconscious Myka sees a vision of her deceased lover Sam Martino (Gabriel Hogan) before she awakens. Artie determines that the comb had once been owned by Italian schemer Lucretia Borgia, and possesses "twisted desires" which will drive everyone around it to violence. Myka and Pete manage to stop Lorna and retrieve the comb. After meeting Mrs. Frederick, Dickenson gives Myka a choice: she can stay in South Dakota or return to Washington, but Pete must stay at Warehouse 13 either way. Myka stays.

Artifacts
 Aztec Bloodstone - used in human sacrifices. The museum worker affected by the Bloodstone took a ceremonial Aztec knife and attacked the Mexican Ambassador's daughter, who he was somehow able to identify as a virgin.
 Tesla - a polyphase electrical stun gun invented by Nikola Tesla. Standard issue weapon for Warehouse Agents, seen in multiple episodes. The power on the Tesla has settings from 1 to 5 in half-point increments; Artie suggests not using it above 2.
 Farnsworth - a two-way video communication system invented by Philo Farnsworth. It's relatively flat, with several knobs to select communication frequencies and a round, black and white screen. In a later episode, Artie mentions that they have their frequency, which cannot be hacked. Standard issue for Warehouse Agents, seen in multiple episodes.
 American football - when thrown, it circles the earth and returns to the place it was thrown, seen in multiple episodes. Its artifact nature is explained in the season 4 premiere, "A New Hope".
 Wand - unknown effect. Artie uses it to "fix the fish."
 Thomas Edison's Bio-Electric Vehicle - created as a prototype for Henry Ford, but he chose to forego the electric car in favor of the internal combustion engine. If two people hold onto the bar on the front of the vehicle, their bodies' electricity powers the car.
 Harry Houdini's Wallet - Possesses the power of "charonic transfer," allowing the bearer to see and hear visions of dead people. Causes Myka to see her deceased partner, Sam Martino. According to the tag on the shelf, the wallet was obtained three days after Houdini's death.
 Tea kettle - The kettle can move around unnoticed; it sneaks into Pete's hand while Artie explains the Warehouse's function. The kettle grants wishes, but if someone makes a wish that cannot be granted, the kettle produces a ferret instead; nobody knows why it does this.
 Mayan Calendar - Artie states that two Warehouse Agents had their "clocks stopped" with this artifact, implying that they're still alive but wish they won't be in a hundred years. Not shown but mentioned.
 Lucrezia Borgia's comb - transmits the famous Italian murderess's mindset through the crystals in the comb. It also gives the bearer the ability to control others' actions, using an Italian phrase as a phonetic trigger.
 Pandora's Box - Artie briefly mentions that Pandora's box is kept (empty) in Aisle 989-B of Warehouse 13.

Production
"Pilot" marked the first series debut after SyFy changed its name from The Sci Fi Channel. "Pilot" was produced by Universal Cable Productions. Development of the series began in 2005, and a number of people worked on the pilot, with multiple versions of the script, before a version credited to Mote, Espenson and Simkins was ordered in October 2007. The pilot for Warehouse 13 was Eddie McClintock's 10th pilot. The previous nine were unsuccessful. Warehouse 13 is the first series where McClintock has received top billing, although he was the lead in two unsuccessful pilots. Showrunner Jack Kenny feels that roles are partially defined by their actor, and that writer Simkins "in crafting the pilot, I think really made it a nice fit for Jo and Eddie to slip into these parts and Saul as well."

The opening museum scenes were shot at the Royal Ontario Museum in Toronto.

Reception
"Pilot" was the most-watched cable show on its night, with 3.5 million viewers. This earned Syfy its third best premiere, after Stargate Atlantis and Eureka. Joanne Ostrow of The Denver Post described it as "X-Files light, with the bickering Scully and Mulder stand-ins going off on Indiana Jones-style adventures." IGN reviewer Ramsey Isler gave "Pilot" a positive review, but felt that it wasn't enough to give "SyFy a chance to once again boast the best sci-fi show on TV." Entertainment Weekly gave it a negative review, describing it as an "unholy cross between The X-Files, Bones, and Raiders of the Lost Ark." Carlos Delgado of iFMagazine.com gave the episode a "B". He liked the premise, but felt that two hours was too long, saying "smart editing could have trimmed to show to at least an hour and a half, maybe even an hour." Randee Dawn of Reuters felt that the "by-the-numbers hate/bonding ritual" between the lead characters in "Pilot" was weak, saying they are "no Mulder and Scully".

John Booth of Wired listed ten things that parents should consider when watching "Pilot" with their children: Language, which included "screwing off” and “what the hell." Violence, including fisticuffs, guns, and "a pretty tame immolation and crispy corpse." "One genuine moment of heart-race goosebumps." A brief scene involving a semi-nude woman in bed. That the show was unrealistic and parallelled to other television shows and movies, and other observations that he and his daughter made. Amy Amatangelo of Zap2it singled out the character Pete's line "I’m trained to take a bullet if necessary, but I’m not sure how to stop a dead Italian cougar" as one of her quotes of the week.

Jason Hughes of TV Squad enjoyed two mysteries that "Pilot" sets up, but does not explain: why "CCH Pounder's Mrs. Frederic may be much older than she appears", and that the character Leena may be Mrs. Frederic's daughter. John Dugan of Time Out New York felt the episode was "ultimately slightly less than satisfying."

References

External links

 

Warehouse 13 episodes
2009 American television episodes
Warehouse 13
Television episodes written by Jane Espenson